Dmitry Ivanovich Dubyago (Дмитрий Иванович Дубяго in Russian) (September 21 (N.S. October 3), 1849 – October 22, 1918) was a Russian astronomer and expert in theoretical astrophysics, astrometry, and gravimetry. A crater on the Moon is named after Dmitry Dubyago.

See also 

 Alexander Dubyago
 crater Dubyago

References

Astronomers from the Russian Empire
1849 births
1918 deaths
Privy Councillor (Russian Empire)